General Lord Mark Ralph George Kerr GCB (15 December 1817 – 17 May 1900) was a British Army officer who served in the Crimean War and in India.

Background
Kerr was born in his ancestral home (Newbattle Abbey), in Midlothian, Scotland in 1817; the son of William Kerr, 6th Marquess of Lothian and his second wife Lady Harriet Scott (daughter of the 3rd Duke of Buccleuch). He was one of 12 Kerr siblings from two mothers.

Military career
Kerr was commissioned (by purchase) into the army on 19 June 1835 as an Ensign in the 20th (East Devonshire) Regiment of Foot and served in the Crimean War and various campaigns in India, including the Indian Mutiny. From 1842 to 1853 Kerr served with his regiment, which was a reserve battalion stationed in Bermuda and Canada. His military career summary is as follows:

14 September 1838 Promoted Lieutenant (by purchase)
26 June 1840 Promoted Captain (by purchase)
27 September 1841 Embarked with regiment for overseas service
1842-1847 Serving with regiment in Bermuda
1848-1853 Serving with regiment in Canada
25 July 1851 Promoted Major (by purchase)
30 December 1853 Promoted Lieutenant Colonel (by purchase)
1854 Serving with regiment in Winchester, England
22 December 1854 Took command of the 13th (1st Somersetshire) (Prince Albert's Light Infantry) Regiment of Foot
30 June 1855 Commanded 13th Light Infantry in the Crimean War (at battles of Tchernaya and fall of Sebastopol)
1857 Commanded the 13th Light Infantry in the Indian Mutiny
5 April 1858 Led a small but successful force that defeated far larger enemy forces at the Siege of Azimghur, India
28 September 1858 Appointed Companion of the Order of the Bath (CB)
September 1862 Promoted Brigadier-General
1865 Left the 13th Light Infantry
6 March 1868 Promoted Major-General
1874 Commanded the Poona Division of the Bombay Army
13 July 1876 Promoted Lieutenant General
11 November 1878 Promoted General
1881 Birthday Honours Advanced to Knight Commander of the Order of the Bath (KCB)
1893 Birthday Honours Advanced to Knight Grand Cross of the Order of the Bath (GCB)
1877 Appointed Regimental Colonel of the 54th Regiment of Foot until 1880
22 February 1880 Appointed Regimental Colonel of the successor of the 13th Light Infantry Regiment, i.e. the Somerset Light Infantry (Prince Albert's); a post he held until his death in 1900.

The Kerr family's association with the 13th Light Infantry was a longstanding one, as an earlier Lord Mark Kerr had a colonelcy in the regiment in its early years.

He published a journal of his military experiences and travels.

Death 
He died a bachelor in London in 1900.

See also
 Battle of the Chernaya
 Siege of Sevastopol (1854–1855)
 Indian Rebellion of 1857
 British Indian Army

References

British Army generals
1817 births
1900 deaths
Knights Grand Cross of the Order of the Bath
Somerset Light Infantry officers
Younger sons of marquesses